The year 1851 in archaeology included many events, some of which are listed below.

Explorations

Excavations
 Some excavation at Susa by William Loftus, who identifies the location.

Publications
 J. Collingwood Bruce's The Roman Wall: a historical, topographical, and descriptive account of the barrier of the lower isthmus, extending from the Tyne to the Solway.
 Daniel Wilson's The Archaeology and Prehistoric Annals of Scotland, which introduces the word prehistoric into the English archaeological vocabulary.

Miscellaneous

John Disney endows the Disney Professorship of Archaeology in the University of Cambridge, first held by John Howard Marsden

Births
 29 June: Jane Dieulafoy, born Jeanne Magre, French archaeologist, excavator of Susa, explorer, novelist and journalist (d. 1916)
 8 July: Arthur Evans, English archaeologist best known for discovering the palace of Knossos on Crete (d. 1941)

Deaths

References

Archaeology
Archaeology by year
Archaeology
Archaeology